Calymperes schmidtii is a species of moss. First discovered and mentioned in 1901. No sub-species are listed in the Catalogue of Life.

References

Dicranales